Heike Wermer (born 5 May 1988) is a German politician for the Christian Democratic Union of Germany (CDU) and, since 2017, a member of the Landtag of North Rhine-Westphalia, the diet of the largest German federal state.

Life and politics 
Wermer was born 1988 and entered the CDU in 2011. Since 2017 she has been a member of the Landtag of North Rhine-Westpahlia.

References 

Living people
1988 births
Christian Democratic Union of Germany politicians
21st-century German women politicians
Members of the Landtag of North Rhine-Westphalia
People from Ahaus